William Devlin may refer to:

William Devlin (actor) (1911–1987), Scottish actor
William Devlin (footballer, born 1893), English footballer (Stockport County, Cardiff City, Newport County)
William Devlin (footballer, born 1899), Scottish footballer (Cowdenbeath FC, Huddersfield Town, Liverpool FC, Heart of Midlothian)
William Devlin (footballer, born 1931), Scottish footballer (Carlisle United)
William J. Devlin (1875–1938), American Jesuit and academic administrator
Bill Devlin (born c.1947), American politician (North Dakota representative)
Billy Devlin (born 1969), American actor